The Eureka Federal Savings Classic was a golf tournament on the Champions Tour played only in 1981. It was played in San Francisco, California at the Harding Park Golf Club. The purse for the tournament was US$150,000, with $25,000 going to the winner, Don January.

References

Former PGA Tour Champions events
Golf in California
Sports competitions in San Francisco